Mad Dog is the fourth solo studio album by the bassist for The Who, John Entwistle, and his last for six years, and the debut album by his band John Entwistle's Ox.

Mad Dog didn't generate much interest, either in sales or among fans, in what sounded like and is often referred as to by fans as "The Son of" Rigor Mortis a second volume of Rock & Roll pastiches rubbing shoulders with items of dubious taste.

His next solo album Too Late the Hero would become his most successful while Mad Dog was his least successful solo album until the release of The Rock.

The song "Cell Number 7", (which is a close relation to The Who's "Long Live Rock") detailed The Who's then recent brush with Canadian justice in 1974 after a hotel wrecking spree in Montreal while on their Quadrophenia tour.

Critical reception
AllMusic said that the album "Is enjoyable in short bursts, but it also makes a good case for the conventional wisdom that even the best bass players are only so-so as band leaders.", Allmusic also said that "He can't seem to tell his good jokes from the ones that sink without a trace, he sets his best songs right beside numbers that would have been best left in the rehearsal space, and for a guy who was one-third of England's greatest power trio (plus vocalist), he doesn't always know what to do with a large band."

Track listing
All tracks composed by John Entwistle, except where indicated.

Bonus tracks (2005 reissue)

Personnel
John Entwistle - lead vocals, bass guitar, 8-string bass guitar, synthesizer
Jimmy Ryan - guitar
Mike Wedgwood - guitar, string arrangements
Robert A. Johnson - guitar (2, 6, 7)
Eddie Jobson - piano, violin
Tony Ashton - piano
John Mealing - piano
Mike Deacon - piano (2)
Nashville Katz - string arrangements
John Mumford - trombone
Dick Parry - baritone saxophone
Howie Casey - tenor saxophone
Dave Caswell - trumpet
Doreen Chanter - background vocals
Irene Chanter - background vocals
Juanita "Honey" Franklin - background vocals
Graham Deakin - drums, percussion

References

1975 albums
John Entwistle albums